Posa Hrostao is the third studio album released by popular Greek singer, Chrispa. It was released in Greece in 2006 by Minos EMI and was certified gold by IFPI.

Track listing
 "Posa Hrostao"
 "Emis Pou Agapame"
 "To Thima"
 "Pos"
 "Des Apopse To Fegari"
 "Mine" (duet with Themis Adamantidis)
 "Apodixe Pos M'Agapas"
 "Giali"
 "Fotia (Salma Ya Salama)"
 "De S'Agapo"
 "Perimene Me"
 "I Gineka Tis Zois Sou"
 "De Se Thimame"
 "Mi Me Kitas"
 "Vasanizome"

References

2006 albums
Greek-language albums
Minos EMI albums
Chrispa albums